Village Christian School may refer to:

 Village Christian School (California)
 Village Christian School (Ohio)